Kwality Wall's is an Indian multinational frozen desserts brand owned by the Indian consumer goods company Hindustan Unilever. It is a major producer and distributor of frozen dessert products in India, Bangladesh, Bhutan, Brunei, Myanmar, Nepal, Sri Lanka, Thailand, Singapore and Malaysia. Kwality Wall's products contain no milk derivatives.

History
Kwality Wall's is a company of Hindustan Unilever, the arm of Unilever in India. It is an amalgamated brand name created out of two previously separate independent companies that Unilever took over: Kwality of India and Wall's of Great Britain.

Kwality, the original Indian company, was founded in 1956, and was the first in the region to import machinery for the mass production and sale of ice cream on a commercial scale. In 1995, in view of the growth potential of the frozen confections market, Kwality entered into an agreement with Lever, and has since been known by its current umbrella name. At the same time, other brands acquired by Hindustan Unilever, such as Gaylord-Milkfood, were phased out in favour of promoting the Kwality Wall's brand. This arrangement allows for local production and sale of Wall's products that are popular in its home market, such as the Cornetto cone, and to create local variations on others, such as the Feast Jaljeera Blast. Kwality Wall's was ranked 464th among India's most trusted brands according to the Brand Trust Report 2012, a study conducted by Trust Research Advisory. In the Brand Trust Report 2013, Kwality Wall's was ranked 632nd among India's most trusted brands and subsequently, according to the Brand Trust Report 2014, Kwality Wall's was ranked 382nd among India's most trusted brands.

In August 2013, Kwality Wall's extended to Bangladesh, Bhutan, Brunei and Nepal.

See also
 List of frozen dessert brands

References

External links
Kwality Wall's at Hindustan Lever Limited

Confectionery companies of India
Unilever brands
Ice cream brands
Manufacturing companies based in Mumbai
Food and drink companies based in Mumbai
Food and drink companies established in 1956
Brand name frozen desserts
[[Category:Indian companies established in 1800
]]
1956 establishments in Bombay State